The 5th Youth in Film Awards ceremony (now known as the Young Artist Awards), presented by the Youth in Film Association, honored outstanding youth performers under the age of 21 in the fields of film, television and theater for the 1982-1983 season, and took place on December 4, 1983, at the Beverly Hilton Hotel in Beverly Hills, California.

Established in 1978 by long-standing Hollywood Foreign Press Association member, Maureen Dragone, the Youth in Film Association was the first organization to establish an awards ceremony specifically set to recognize and award the contributions of performers under the age of 18 in the fields of film, television, theater and music.

Categories
★ Bold indicates the winner in each category.

Best Young Performer in a Feature Film

Best Young Motion Picture Actor in a Feature Film
★ C. Thomas Howell - The Outsiders (Warner Bros)
Torquil Campbell - The Golden Seal (Samuel Goldwyn Co.)
Sebastian Duncan - Man, Woman and Child (Paramount)
Frederick Koehler - Mr. Mom (20th Century Fox)
Kelly Reno - The Black Stallion Returns (M.G.M.)

Best Young Motion Picture Actress in a Feature Film
★ Roxana Zal - Table for Five (Warner Bros)
Katherine Healy - Six Weeks (Universal)
Diane Lane - Rumble Fish (Universal)
Ally Sheedy - WarGames (M.G.M.)

Best Young Supporting Actor In a Motion Picture
★ Scott Schwartz - The Toy (Columbia)
Allan Hubbard - Tender Mercies (EMI)
Robby Kiger - Table for Five (Warner Bros)
Jeremy Licht - Twilight Zone: The Movie (Warner Bros)
Danny Pintauro - Cujo (Warner Bros)

Best Young Supporting Actress In a Motion Picture
★ Missy Francis - Man, Woman and Child (Paramount)
Diane Lane - The Outsiders (Warner Bros)
Arlene McIntyre - Man, Woman and Child (Paramount)
Christina Nigra - Twilight Zone: The Movie (Warner Bros)
Dana Hill - Cross Creek (Universal)

Best Young Performer in a Television Movie

Best Young Actor in a Movie Made for Television
★ Gary Coleman - The Boy With the 200 IQ (NBC)
Khalif Bobatoon - In Defense of the Kids (CBS)
David Faustino - Summer Girl (CBS)
Keith Coogan - Wrong Way Kid (CBS)
Evan Richards - One Cooks, The Other Doesn't (CBS)
Demetri Thomas - Grandpa, Will You Run With Me? (NBC)

Best Young Actress in a Movie Made for Television
★ Sydney Penny - The Thorn Birds (ABC)
Quinn Cummings - Grandpa, Will You Run with Me? (NBC)
Tracey Gold - ABC Afterschool Special - Hand Me Down Kid (ABC)
Katy Kurtzman - Allison Sydney Harrison (NBC)
Kari Michaelsen - The Boy With the 200 IQ (NBC)
Kyle Richards - This is Kate Bennett (ABC)

Best Young Performer in a Television Series

Best Young Actor in a Drama Series
★ River Phoenix - Seven Brides For Seven Brothers (CBS)
David Friedman - Little House on the Prairie: A New Beginning (NBC)
Timothy Gibbs - Father Murphy (NBC)
Chris Hebert - Boone (NBC)
John Kovacs - Second Family Tree (NBC)
Matthew Laborteaux - Little House on the Prairie: A New Beginning (NBC)
Scott Mellini - Father Murphy (NBC)

Best Young Actress in a Drama Series
★ Melissa Gilbert - Little House on the Prairie: A New Beginning (NBC)
Allison Balson - Little House on the Prairie: A New Beginning (NBC)
Tonya Crowe - Knots Landing (CBS)
Shannen Doherty - Little House on the Prairie: A New Beginning (NBC)
Melora Hardin - Second Family Tree (NBC)
Corin Nelson - Moving Right Along (PBS)
Julie Anne Haddock - Boone (NBC)
Cynthia Gibb - Fame (Syndicated)

Best Young Actor in a Comedy Series
★ Ricky Schroder - Silver Spoons (NBC)
Jason Bateman - Silver Spoons (NBC)
Todd Bridges - Diff'rent Strokes (NBC)
Eric Brown - Mama's Family (NBC)
Gary Coleman - Diff'rent Strokes (NBC)
Bobby Fite - Silver Spoons (NBC)
Andre Gower - Baby Makes Five (NBC)
Jeffrey Jaquet - Whiz Kids (CBS)
Emmanuel Lewis - Webster (ABC)
Keith Mitchell - Gun Shy (NBC)
Corky Pigeon - Silver Spoons (NBC)
Marc Price - Family Ties (NBC)
Shavar Ross - Diff'rent Strokes (NBC)
Glenn Scarpelli - One Day at a Time (CBS)

Best Young Actress in a Comedy Series
★ Missy Gold - Benson (ABC)
Karin Argoud - Mama's Family (NBC)
Bridgette Andersen - Gunshy (NBC)
Justine Bateman - Family Ties (NBC)
Danielle Brisebois - Archie Bunker's Place (CBS)
Mindy Cohn - The Facts of Life (NBC)
Kim Fields - The Facts of Life (NBC)
Lauri Hendler - Gimme a Break! (NBC)
Sarah Jessica Parker - Square Pegs (CBS)
Nancy McKeon - The Facts of Life (NBC)
Dana Plato - Diff'rent Strokes (NBC)
Jill Whelan - The Love Boat (ABC)
Lisa Whelchel - The Facts of Life (NBC)
Tina Yothers - Family Ties (NBC)

Best Young Actor in a New Television Series
★ John P. Navin, Jr. - Jennifer Slept Here (NBC)
Timothy Gibbs - The Rousters (NBC)
Billy Jacoby - It's Not Easy (ABC)
Matthew Laborteaux - Whiz Kids (CBS)
Todd Porter - Whiz Kids (CBS)
Glenn Scarpelli - Jennifer Slept Here (NBC)

Best Young Actress in a New Television Series
★ Tracey Gold - Goodnight, Beantown (CBS)
Melanie Gaffin - Whiz Kids (CBS)
Rachel Jacobs - It's Not Easy (ABC)
Laura Jacoby - Mr. Smith (NBC)
Robyn Lively - Boone (NBC)
Amanda Peterson - Boone (NBC)

Best Young Actor in a Daytime Soap 
★ (tie) David Mendenhall - General Hospital (ABC)
★ (tie) John Stamos - General Hospital (ABC)
Michael Damian - The Young and the Restless (CBS)
Lanny Palaco - As the World Turns (CBS)
Damion Scheller - Search for Tomorrow (CBS)

Best Young Actress in a Daytime Soap
★ Tracey Bregman - The Young and the Restless (CBS)
Kristian Alfonso - Days of Our Lives (NBC)
Lori-Nan Engler - The Doctors (ABC)
Debbie Lytton - Days of Our Lives (NBC)
Lisa Trusel - Days of Our Lives (NBC)

Best Young Actor: Guest in a Series
★ Timothy Patrick Murphy - The Love Boat (ABC)
Corey Feldman - Lottery! (ABC)
Jason Hervey - Gun Shy (NBC)
Jason Lively - The Dukes of Hazzard (NBC)
Chad Sheets - Magnum, P.I. (CBS)
Byron Thames - CHiPs (NBC)

Best Young Actress: Guest in a Series
★ Dana Hill - Magnum, P.I. (CBS)
Andre Fox - Diff'rent Strokes (NBC)
Angela Lee - The Love Boat (ABC)
Heather O'Rourke - Webster (ABC)
Kim Richards - Magnum, P.I. (CBS)

Best Family Entertainment

Best Family Feature Motion Picture
★ Return of the Jedi (20th Century Fox)Cross Creek (Universal)
The Golden Seal (Samuel Goldwyn)
The Outsiders (Warner Bros.)
WarGames (M.G.M.)

Best Family Motion Picture: Comedy or Musical
★ Mr. Mom (20th Century Fox)Max Dugan Returns (20th Century Fox)
Staying Alive (Paramount)

Best New Television Series
★ Goodnight Beantown (CBS)Boone (NBC)Jennifer Slept Here (NBC)Mr. Smith (NBC)Webster (ABC)Whiz Kids (CBS)

Special awards
The Michael Landon Award
Outstanding Contribution To Youth Through Television
★ Norman Lear

The Jackie Coogan Award
Outstanding Contribution To Youth Through Motion Pictures
★ 'Snow White and the Seven Dwarfs - DisneyYouth In Film's Former Child Star Award
★ Ann JillianYouth in Film's Theatre Arts Award
★ Aaron LohrYouth In Film's Special Achievement Award
★ Glenn ScarpelliYouth In Film's Community Benefit Award
★ Television Special Adam - John Walsh'''

References

External links
Official site

Young Artist Awards ceremonies
1983 film awards
1983 television awards
1983 in American cinema
1983 in American television
1983 in California